Wilhelm His Jr. (29 December 1863 – 10 November 1934) was a Swiss  cardiologist and anatomist, son of Wilhelm His Sr.

In 1893, His discovered the bundle of His, the collection of specialized cardiac muscle cells in the heart that transmits electrical impulses and helps synchronize contraction of the cardiac muscles.  Later in life, as a professor of medicine at the University of Berlin, he was one of the first to recognize that "the heartbeat has its origin in the individual cells of heart muscle."

Werner–His disease (or trench fever) was also named after him.

Angle of His (or incisura cardiaca) was posthumously named after him by Daniel John Cunningham in 1906.

Works
 Die Front der Ärzte . Velhagen & Klasing, Bielefeld [u.a.] 1931 Digital edition by the University and State Library Düsseldorf

References

External links
 

1863 births
1934 deaths
German cardiologists